Florencio Gascón Álvarez (born 24 January 1964, in Madrid) is a retired Spanish athlete who specialised in sprinting events. He represented his country at the 1988 Summer Olympics as well as the 1991 World Indoor Championships.

Competition record

Personal bests
Outdoor
100 metres – 10.47 (-0.7 m/s, Soria 1990)
Indoor
60 metres – 6.69 (Madrid 1991)

References

All-Athletics profile

1964 births
Living people
Spanish male sprinters
Athletes from Madrid
Olympic athletes of Spain
Athletes (track and field) at the 1988 Summer Olympics